This is a list of Bien de Interés Cultural landmarks in the Province of Valencia, Spain.

 Convent of Santo Domingo
 Sagunto Roman theatre

References 

 
Valencia